is a 30-meter sized asteroid and near-Earth object that is possibly the first Apohele asteroid (Atira) – an asteroid that is always closer to the Sun than Earth – detected. It was first observed on 23 February 1998, by David J. Tholen at Mauna Kea Observatory, Hawaii, but is now considered a lost minor planet.

Although its orbital elements have not been well established, its aphelion (farthest distance from Sun) was determined to be less than the Earth's distance to the Sun (0.980 ± 0.05 AU). Therefore, it has a claim to title "first Apohele detected", if not "first Apohele confirmed", which goes to 163693 Atira. This asteroid is estimated to measure 30 meters in diameter based on its absolute magnitude 25.0 and an assumed albedo of 0.20, typical for stony S-type asteroid and common among near-Earth objects.

References

External links 
 Astronomers Find New Class of Asteroid, University of Hawaii Institute for Astronomy, 1 July 1998
 
 
 

Minor planet object articles (unnumbered)
Lost minor planets
19980223